Dyella koreensis is a Gram-negative, aerobic and non-motile bacterium from the genus of Dyella which has been isolated from rhizospheric soil of bamboo plant from Korea. Dyella koreensis produces beta-glucosidase.

References

Xanthomonadales
Bacteria described in 2005